Iturralde may refer to:

Abel Iturralde Province, one of the twenty provinces of the Bolivian department of La Paz
Edna Iturralde, Ecuadorian author who has won many national and international awards
Eduardo Iturralde González (born 1967), Spanish football referee
Estadio Carlos Iturralde, multi-use stadium in the Mexican city of Mérida, Yucatán
Iturralde Crater, 8 km diameter circular feature in the Bolivian portion of the Amazon Rainforest, first identified in 1985
Manuel Ignacio de Vivanco Iturralde, Peruvian politician and military leader
Pedro Iturralde (1929–2020), Spanish saxophonist, saxophone teacher and composer of classical music
Iturralde (Bilbao), neighbourhood in the Ibaiondo district of Bilbao, Spain
Iturralde (Panama), subdivision of La Chorrera District in Panamá Oeste Province, Panama